Mays Pond is a lake located west of Raquette Lake, New York. Fish species present in the lake are black bullhead, and sunfish. There is trail access on the east shore. The west shore is privately owned. No motors are allowed on this pond.

References

Lakes of Hamilton County, New York
Lakes of New York (state)